Major-General Albert John Woodrow  (1919–1988) was a British Army officer.

Military career
Woodrow was commissioned into the Royal Corps of Signals on 25 May 1940 during the Second World War. He became commanding officer of 1 Divisional Signal Regiment at Verden an der Aller in Germany in 1961. He went on to be Commander of the Royal Signals Training Group in 1965, Director of Army Public Relations in 1968 and General Officer Commanding Wales in 1970 before retiring in 1973.

References

 

1919 births
1988 deaths
Members of the Order of the British Empire
British Army generals
Royal Corps of Signals officers
British Army personnel of World War II